Jelka is a feminine given name that may refer to the following notable people:
Jelka Glumičić (born 1941), Croatian human rights activist 
Jelka Godec Schmidt (born 1958), Slovene illustrator and writer of children's books
Jelka Reichman (born 1939), Slovene painter and illustrator
Jelka Rosen (1868–1935), German painter
Jelka van Houten (born 1978), Dutch actress